Boy or Girl? (Spanish: ¿Chico o chica?) is a 1962 Mexican-Spanish musical comedy film directed by Antonio del Amo.

Cast
 Maleni Castro 
 Maleni de Castro 
 Manuel de Juan 
 Eulália del Pino 
 Miguel Gómez 
 Fernando Liger 
 Maleni 
 Gracita Morales 
 Luis Moreno 
 Erasmo Pascual 
 Cesáreo Quezadas 'Pulgarcito'
 Manuel Rojas

References

Bibliography 
 de España, Rafael. Directory of Spanish and Portuguese film-makers and films. Greenwood Press, 1994.

External links 
 

1962 musical comedy films
Spanish musical comedy films
1962 films
Mexican musical comedy films
1960s Spanish-language films
Films directed by Antonio del Amo
1960s Spanish films
1960s Mexican films